Adam Bowling is an American businessman and politician serving as a member of the Kentucky House of Representatives from the 87th district. Elected in November 2018, he assumed office on January 1, 2019.

Education 
Bowling earned a Bachelor of Arts degree in economics from Wofford College in 2004.

Career 
Outside of politics, Bowling owns and operates several businesses, including PD Specialty Care, Danville Drug Company, Bowkirk Medical, and People's Choice Pharmacy. He also works as a manager at Boone Trace Development and Redbow. He was elected to the Kentucky House of Representatives in November 2018 and assumed office on January 1, 2019. He has served as vice chair of the House Natural Resources and Energy Committee and vice chair of the Small Business & Information Technology Committee since 2021.

Committee Assignments 

 Postsecondary Education
 Natural Resources & Energy
 State Government
 Health & Family Services
 Local Government

References 

Living people
Kentucky Republicans
Businesspeople from Kentucky
Wofford College alumni
Year of birth missing (living people)